The Butcher and the Blade are an American professional wrestling tag team signed to All Elite Wrestling (AEW). The team is currently managed by Allie who currently goes by the name the Bunny.

The team debuted in September 2017 and wrestled in the independent circuit, as well as several regional promotions such as Bar Wrestling, Beyond Wrestling, and Empire State Wrestling in the United States and Capital City Championship Combat (C4) and Smash Wrestling in Canada.

History

Independent circuit (2017–2019)

The Butcher and the Blade made their debut in Pro Wrestling Rampage (PWR) on September 9, 2017, defeating the Upper Echelon (Colby Redd and P. B. Smooth) for the PWR Tag Team Championship. Starting in January 2018, they became a regular tag team in Buffalo, New York based Empire State Wrestling (ESW), calling the promotion their home and competing against teams involving Ultimo Dragon, Eddie Kingston, and Homicide.  In April 2018, they made their Bar Wrestling debut teaming with Brody King in a losing effort against Eli Drake, Joey Ryan, and Kevin Martenson. They would later team with Tyler Bateman as "Two Butchers and the Blade" in Bar Wrestling's Trios Tournament losing to SoCal Uncensored (Christopher Daniels, Frankie Kazarian, and Scorpio Sky). On August 8, 2019, they made their Progress Wrestling debut losing to Aussie Open (Kyle Fletcher and Mark Davis) in a three-way tag team match with the Dark Order (Evil Uno and Stu Grayson).

All Elite Wrestling (2019–present)
On the November 27, 2019 episode of AEW Dynamite, the Butcher and the Blade, led by a returning Allie as "the Bunny", made their All Elite Wrestling (AEW) debut when they attacked Cody Rhodes after coming from underneath the mat. It was later revealed by MJF and Wardlow that they were behind the attack on Cody, thus forming an alliance with the Butcher, the Blade, and the Bunny. They made their in-ring debut on the December 11, 2019 episode of Dynamite, defeating Cody and Q. T. Marshall. At Bash at the Beach, the Butcher and the Blade teamed with MJF and defeated Diamond Dallas Page, Dustin Rhodes, and Q. T. Marshall. 

In May 2020, the Bunny ceased appearing with the Butcher and the Blade as Butcher and Blade continued teaming as well as appearing in the crowd during the COVID-19 pandemic. On the May 27 episode of Dynamite, Butcher and Blade attacked the Young Bucks after Nick Jackson accidentally superkicked Blade who was in the crowd. However, FTR came to the aid of the Young Bucks and helped them fend off Butcher and Blade. On the June 10 episode of Dynamite, Butcher and Blade were defeated by FTR. Butcher and Blade would then form an alliance with the Lucha Brothers as they defeated FTR and the Young Bucks at Fyter Fest. On the July 24 episode of Dynamite, Butcher and Blade were defeated by the Young Bucks in a Falls Count Anywhere match. On the August 22 episode of Dynamite, Butcher and Blade and the Lucha Brothers began showing dissension after they were defeated by Jurassic Express and Natural Nightmares. However, Eddie Kingston would help unite the group together once again. On the November 18 episode of Dynamite, the Lucha Brothers would turn against Butcher and Blade, as well as Kingston, after they attacked Pac.

Following AEW Revolution, the Butcher, the Blade and the Bunny ended their alliance with Kingston after he turned face and began teaming with Jon Moxley as they allied themselves with Matt Hardy who along with Private Party created a faction known as the Hardy Family Office.

Personal lives
Before making his wrestling debut in 2016, Andy Williams was Every Time I Die's rhythm guitarist since he co-formed the band in 1998 until their breakup in January 2022. Williams band's breakup was referenced by Max Caster on the September 30, 2022, episode of AEW Rampage saying in his entrance rap “Tonight our hands go up, ya'll are losers, and that's why your band broke up” with the duo unsurprisingly showing a disgusted look at Caster. Jesse Guilmette (The Blade) and Laura Dennis (The Bunny) are real-life partners and got married on September 21, 2013.

Championships and accomplishments
Pro Wrestling Rampage
PWR Tag Team Championship (1 time)

References

External links
Kickin' Ass with Jesse and Andy on iTunes
Kickin' Ass with Jesse and Andy on YouTube
Cagematch.net profile

All Elite Wrestling teams and stables
Independent promotions teams and stables